The 1988 Minnesota Twins finished at 91–71, second in the AL West. 3,030,672 fans attended Twins games, at the time, establishing a new major league record. Pitcher Allan Anderson had his most successful season in 1988, winning the American League ERA title at 2.45 and compiling a record of 16-9 in 30 starts.

Offseason
 November 7, 1987: Eric Bullock was signed as a free agent by the Twins.
 December 21, 1987: Don Baylor was released by the Twins.
 December 21, 1987: Dan Schatzeder was released by the Twins.
 December 21, 1987: Mike Smithson was released by the Twins.
 January 1988: Vic Rodriguez was signed as a free agent by the Twins.
 January 4, 1988: Brian Harper was signed as a free agent by the Twins.
 March 18, 1988: Sal Butera was released by the Twins.
 March 24, 1988: Billy Beane was traded by the Twins to the Detroit Tigers for Balvino Gálvez.

Regular season

Five Twins made the All-Star Game, 
third baseman Gary Gaetti, outfielder Kirby Puckett, catcher Tim Laudner, starting pitcher Frank Viola, and relief pitcher Jeff Reardon.

On September 16, Puckett got his 1000th hit, becoming just the fifth major leaguer to achieve that total before completing his fifth year.

On September 17, reliever Reardon collected his 40th save of the season.  With 41 saves as a 1985 Montreal Expo, he became the only major league player to reach 40 saves in each league.

Frank Viola became the first Twins player since Jim Perry in 1970 to win the AL Cy Young Award.

Offense

Kirby Puckett hit .356 with 24 HR, drove in 121 runs and scored 109.
Puckett led the AL with 234 hits, 163 singles, and 358 total bases. Puckett's 234 hits were the most by a right-handed batter since Joe Medwick had 237 hits in 1937.

Kent Hrbek hit .312 with 25 HR and 76 RBI.
Gary Gaetti hit .301 with 28 HR and 88 RBI.

Pitching

The Twins had two solid starting pitchers: Frank Viola (24-7), 
and Allan Anderson (16-9). Frank Viola led the AL with 24 wins. Allan Anderson led the AL with a 2.45 ERA. Reliever Jeff Reardon had 42 saves. Bert Blyleven (10-17, 5.43 ERA) led the AL with 17 losses, 125 earned runs allowed, and 16 hit batsmen.

*League leader

Defense

Third baseman Gary Gaetti and center fielder Kirby Puckett each won their third Gold Glove Award.

Season standings

Record vs. opponents

Roster

Notable transactions
 April 5, 1988: John Moses was signed as a free agent by the Twins.
 April 22, 1988: Tom Brunansky was traded by the Twins to the St. Louis Cardinals for Tom Herr.
 May 28, 1988: John Christensen was signed as a free agent by the Twins.
 June 27, 1988: Dan Schatzeder was signed as a free agent by the Twins.

Notable games
 September 17: Jeff Reardon becomes the first pitcher in baseball history to record 40 saves in both leagues in a 3-1 win versus the White Sox.

Player stats

Batting

Starters by position
Note: Pos = Position; G = Games played; AB = At bats; H = Hits; Avg. = Batting average; HR = Home runs; RBI = Runs batted in

Other batters
Note: G = Games played; AB = At bats; H = Hits; Avg. = Batting average; HR = Home runs; RBI = Runs batted in

Pitching

Starting pitchers
Note: G = Games pitched; IP = Innings pitched; W = Wins; L = Losses; ERA = Earned run average; SO = Strikeouts

Other pitchers
Note: G = Games pitched; IP = Innings pitched; W = Wins; L = Losses; ERA = Earned run average; SO = Strikeouts

Relief pitchers
Note: G = Games pitched; W = Wins; L = Losses; SV = Saves; ERA = Earned run average; SO = Strikeouts

Awards and honors
 Gary Gaetti, Third Baseman, Gold Glove Award
 Kirby Puckett, Centerfield, Gold Glove Award
 Kirby Puckett – American League Leader At-Bats (657)
 Kirby Puckett – American League Leader Hits (234)
 Kirby Puckett – American League Leader Singles (163)
 Kirby Puckett – Major League Baseball Leader Total Bases (358)

All-Star Game
 Gary Gaetti, third base, reserve
 Tim Laudner, catcher, reserve
 Kirby Puckett, outfield, reserve
 Jeff Reardon, relief pitcher, reserve
 Frank Viola, pitcher, starter

Farm system

References

External links
Player stats from www.baseball-reference.com
Team info from www.baseball-almanac.com

Minnesota Twins seasons
Minnesota Twins season
Minnesota Twins